A very important person or personage (VIP or V.I.P.) is a person who is accorded special privileges due to their high social status, influence or importance. The term was not common until sometime after World War 2 by RAF pilots.

Examples include celebrities, heads of state or heads of government, other politicians, major employers, high rollers, high-level corporate officers, bankers, economists, physicians, clergy, military personnel, crime bosses, wealthy individuals, or any other socially notable person who receives special treatment for any reason. The special treatment usually involves separation from common people, and a higher level of comfort or service.

In some cases, such as with tickets, VIP may be used as a title in a similar way to premium or exclusive. Usually, VIP tickets can be purchased by anyone, but still meaning separation from other customers, own security checks etc.

Sometimes, the term very very important person (VVIP or V.V.I.P.) is also used, especially with reference to VIPs with very high rank or spending power. It is used especially when anyone can buy VIP treatment, to distinguish people with especially high requirements. And V.V.V.I.P. can denote even another level of exclusivity.

References

External links 

Titles
Positions of authority
Popularity